David Joyner may refer to:
 David Joyner (athletic director)
 David Joyner (actor)